The Lincoln Correctional Center  is a minimum-security state prison for men located in Lincoln, Logan County, Illinois, owned and operated by the Illinois Department of Corrections.  The facility was opened in 1984 and has a capacity of 1019 inmates at a minimum security level.  

The campus is adjacent to the Logan Correctional Center and to Edward R. Madigan State Fish and Wildlife Area (formerly known as Railsplitter State Park).

References

Prisons in Illinois
Buildings and structures in Logan County, Illinois
1984 establishments in Illinois